The Japanese water shrew (Chimarrogale platycephalus), also called the flat-headed water shrew, is a species of mammal in the family Soricidae. It is endemic to Japanese Islands, Honshu and Kyushu. They are considered extinct in Shikoku.

Description
The dense short fur on the head, back and sides is greyish-black. The underparts are dirty white and are sharply demarcated from the dorsal surface. Sometimes they are tinged with rusty brown or occasionally are entirely dark grey. There is a white spot just behind the eye and often another near the small, rounded ear which is nearly hidden in the fur. The nose is black and the snout long and tapering.

The Japanese water shrew inhabits mountain streams, small rivers and ponds, preying on benthic organisms, such as aquatic insects, crabs, shrimp, and small fish.

See also
Water shrew

References

 

Chimarrogale
Endemic mammals of Japan
Mammals described in 1842
Taxa named by Coenraad Jacob Temminck
Taxonomy articles created by Polbot